Razman bin Zakaria is a Malaysian politician who has served as State Leader of the Opposition of Perak since December 2022 and Member of the Perak State Legislative Assembly (MLA) for Gunong Semanggol since May 2018. He served as Member of the Perak State Executive Council (EXCO) in the Perikatan Nasional (PN) state administration under former Menteri Besar Ahmad Faizal Azumu briefly from March 2020 to the collapse of the PN administration in December 2020 and again from in the Barisan Nasional (BN) state administration under Menteri Besar Saarani Mohamad from December 2020 to November 2022. He is a member and State Commissioner of Perak of the Malaysian Islamic Party (PAS), a component party of the PN coalition.

Election results

References

Living people
People from Perak
Malaysian people of Malay descent
Malaysian Muslims
Malaysian Islamic Party politicians
Members of the Perak State Legislative Assembly
Perak state executive councillors
21st-century Malaysian politicians
1960 births